Chilabad (also Romanized as Chīlābād; also known as Mowtowr-e Sālārī) is a village in Arzuiyeh Rural District, in the Central District of Arzuiyeh County, Kerman Province, Iran. At the 2006 census, its population was 117, in 24 families.

References 

Populated places in Arzuiyeh County